Yorulmaz may refer to:

Places
Yorulmaz, Lice, a neighbourhood in the Lice District of Diyarbakır Province, Turkey

Surname
Ahmet Yorulmaz (1932–2014), Turkish journalist, novelist and translator
Bahtiyar Yorulmaz (born 1955), Turkish former footballer
Oğuz Yorulmaz (died 2005), convicted Yurkish police officer
Sevgi Yorulmaz (born 1982), Turkish para archer